Capote is a 2005 biographical drama film about American novelist Truman Capote directed by Bennett Miller, and starring Philip Seymour Hoffman in the titular role. The screenplay by Dan Futterman was based on Gerald Clarke's 1988 biography Capote and the film primarily follows the events during the writing of Capote's 1965 nonfiction book In Cold Blood.

It was released September 30, 2005, coinciding with Capote's birthday, and became a box office success, grossing $49.9 million against a budget of $7 million. The film received acclaim from critics, in particular for Hoffman's lead performance. 

Capote won several awards, including the National Society of Film Critics Award for Best Film, and was named one of the top ten films of the year by both the American Film Institute and the National Board of Review. It was nominated for five Academy Awards and five British Academy Film Awards, including for best film, best director (for Miller), best supporting actress (for Catherine Keener) and best adapted screenplay (for Futterman), with Hoffman winning the award for best actor at both ceremonies. In addition to the Academy Award and British Academy Film Award, Hoffman won the Golden Globe Award and Screen Actors Guild Award as well as awards from numerous critics groups for his performance. Furthermore, director Miller won the Gotham Independent Film Award for Breakthrough Director and received a nomination at the Directors Guild of America Awards, and Futterman's screenplay was nominated at the Writers Guild of America Awards.

Accolades

References

External links
 

Lists of accolades by film